Christian socialism is a religious and political philosophy that blends Christianity and socialism, endorsing left-wing politics and socialist economics on the basis of the Bible and the teachings of Jesus. Many Christian socialists believe capitalism to be idolatrous and rooted in the sin of greed. Christian socialists identify the cause of social inequality to be the greed that they associate with capitalism. Christian socialism became a major movement in the United Kingdom beginning in the 19th century. The Christian Socialist Movement, known as Christians on the Left since 2013, is one formal group, as well as a faction of the Labour Party.

According to the Encyclopædia Britannica, socialism is a "social and economic doctrine that calls for public rather than private ownership or control of property and natural resources. According to the socialist view, individuals do not live or work in isolation but live in cooperation with one another. Furthermore, everything that people produce is in some sense a social product, and everyone who contributes to the production of a good is entitled to a share in it. Society as a whole, therefore, should own or at least control property for the benefit of all its members. ... Early Christian communities also practised the sharing of goods and labour, a simple form of socialism subsequently followed in certain forms of monasticism. Several monastic orders continue these practices today." The Hutterites believe in strict adherence to biblical principles and church discipline, and practised a form of communism. In the words of historians Max Stanton and Rod Janzen, the Hutterites "established in their communities a rigorous system of Ordnungen, which were codes of rules and regulations that governed all aspects of life and ensured a unified perspective. As an economic system, Christian communism was attractive to many of the peasants who supported social revolution in sixteenth century central Europe", such as the German Peasants' War, and Friedrich Engels came to view Anabaptists as proto-communists.

Other earlier figures viewed as Christian socialists include the 19th-century writers F. D. Maurice (The Kingdom of Christ, 1838), John Malcolm Forbes Ludlow (The Christian Socialist, 1850), Adin Ballou (Practical Christian Socialism, 1854), Thomas Hughes (Tom Brown's School Days, 1857), John Ruskin (Unto This Last, 1862), Charles Kingsley (The Water-Babies, A Fairy Tale for a Land Baby, 1863), Frederick James Furnivall (co-creator of the Oxford English Dictionary), and Francis Bellamy (a Baptist minister and the author of the Pledge of Allegiance in the United States).

History

Biblical age 
Elements that would form the basis of Christian socialism are found in the Old Testament, as well as the New Testaments.

Old Testament 
The Old Testament had divided perspectives on the issue of poverty. One part of the Biblical tradition held that poverty was judgment of God upon the wicked while viewing prosperity as a reward for the good, stating in the  that "[t]he righteous have enough to satisfy their appetite, but the belly of the wicked is empty." There are other sections that instruct generosity to the have nots of society. Mosaic Law instructs followers to treat neighbours equally and to be generous to have nots.

Some of the Psalms include many references to social justice for the poor.

Amos emphasizes the need for justice and righteousness that is described as conduct that emphasizes love for those who are poor and to oppose oppression and injustice towards the poor. The prophet Isaiah, to whom is attributed the first thirty-nine chapters of the Book of Isaiah known as Proto-Isaiah, followed upon Amos' themes of justice and righteousness involving the poor as necessary for followers of God, denouncing those who do not do these things.

The Book of Sirach, one of the deuterocanonical or biblical apocrypha books of the Old Testament, denounces the pursuit of wealth.

New Testament 

The teachings of Jesus are frequently described as socialist, especially by Christian socialists, such as Terry Eagleton.  records that in the early church in Jerusalem "[n]o one claimed that any of their possessions was their own"; this pattern, which helped Christians survive after the siege of Jerusalem, was taken seriously for several centuries, and was an important factor in the rise of feudalism. While it would later disappear from church history except within monasticism, it experienced a revival since the 19th century. Christian socialism was one of the founding threads of the Labour Party in the United Kingdom and is said to begin with the uprising of Wat Tyler and John Ball in the 14th century.

In the New Testament, Jesus identifies himself with the hungry, the poor, the sick, and the prisoners. Matthew 25:31–46 is a major component of Christianity and is considered the cornerstone of Christian socialism. Another key statement in the New Testament that is an important component of Christian socialism is Luke 10:25–37 that follows the statement "You shall love your neighbour as yourself" with the question "And who is my neighbour?" In the Parable of the Good Samaritan. Jesus gives the response that the neighbour includes anyone in need, even people we might be expected to shun. The Samaritans and Jews claim descension from different Tribes of Israel, which had faced a schism prior to the events described in the New Testament. This schism lead to inter-ethnic and inter-religious conflict between the two groups.

Luke 6:20–21 shows Jesus narrating the Sermon on the Plain. It reads: "Blessed are you poor, for yours is the kingdom of God. Blessed are you that hunger now, for you shall be satisfied." Christian socialists cite James the Just, the brother of Jesus, who criticizes the rich intensely and in strong language in the Epistle of James.

During the New Testament period and beyond, there is evidence that many Christian communities practised forms of sharing, redistribution, and communism. Some of the Bible verses that inspired the communal economic arrangements of the Hutterites are found in the book of the Acts.

Church Fathers age 
Basil of Caesarea, the Church Father of the Eastern monks who became Bishop of Caesarea, established a complex around the church and monastery that included hostels, almshouses, and hospitals for infectious diseases. During the great famine of 368, Basil denounced against profiteers and the indifferent rich. Basil wrote a sermon on the Parable of the Rich Fool in which he states:

John Chrysostom declared his reasons for his attitude towards the rich and position of attitude towards wealth. He said:

Early modern period 
During the English Civil War and the period of the Commonwealth of England (1642–1660), the Diggers espoused a political and economic theory rooted in Christianity that bears a strong resemblance to modern socialism, particularly its anarchist and communist strains. Some scholars believe the Munster Rebellion may have formed an early socialist state.

19th century to present 
In "Religion and the Rise of Socialism", historian Eric Hobsbawn argued that the "modern working-class socialist movement has developed an overwhelmingly secular, indeed often militantly anti-religious ideology." At the same time, he and other historians cited examples where this was not the case, particularly Britain in the 19th and 20th centuries, where E. P. Thompson and Stephen Yo said a form of ethical socialism dominated the labour movement. A prominent example of Christian socialism, or socialist Christianity, was Keir Hardie, a founder of the Labour Party in Britain, who said he learnt his "Socialism in the New Testament", where he said he found what he described as his "chief inspiration". Those socialists argued that socialism was the embodiment of the teachings of Jesus, and that it would also rescue the church from Mammon, which they said caused it to have lost its way and become corrupt by siding with the rich and powerful against the poor. According to this view, socialism was not anti-religion but was opposed to those who would use it to support capitalism and the status quo. James Connolly is credited with setting the groundwork for Christian socialism in Ireland. Connolly, who wrote a story for the Christian socialist journal Labour Prophet, said: "It is not Socialism but Capitalism that is opposed to religion ... when the organised Socialist working class tramples upon the Capitalist Class it will not be trampling on a pillar of God's Church but upon a blasphemous defiler of the Sanctuary, it will be rescuing the faith from the impious vermin who make it noisome to the really religious men and women."

In France, Philippe Buchez began to characterize his philosophy as Christian socialism in the 1820s and 1830s. A variety of socialist perspectives emerged in 19th-century Britain, beginning with John Ruskin. Edward R. Norman identifies what he describes as the three "immediate intellectual sources" for mid-century Christian socialism: Samuel Taylor Coleridge, Thomas Carlyle, and Thomas Arnold. The United States also has a Christian socialist tradition. In Utah, it developed and flourished in the first part of the 20th century, playing an important part in the development and expression of radicalism. Part of a larger, nationwide movement in many American Protestant churches, Christian socialism in Utah was particularly strong, and dedicated Christian socialist ministers, such as Episcopal Church bishop Franklin Spencer Spalding of Utah and Congregational minister Myron W. Reed in the American West, were fierce advocates for the miners laboring in the Mountain states.

John Ruskin 
The influential Victorian era art critic John Ruskin expounded theories about social justice in Unto This Last (1860). In it, he stated four goals that might be called socialist even though Ruskin did not use the term.
 "[T]raining schools for youth, established at government cost."
 In connection with these schools, the government should establish "manufactories and workshops, for the production and sale of every necessary of life."
 All unemployed people should be "set to work" or trained for work if needed or forced to work if necessary.
 "[F]or the old and destitute, comfort and home should be provided."

Although Norman says Ruskin was not "an authentic Socialist in any of its various nineteenth-century meanings", as his only real contact with the Christian socialists came through the Working Men's College, he influenced later socialist thinking, especially the artist William Morris.

Artists 
The painters of the Pre-Raphaelite Brotherhood were influenced and sponsored by Ruskin. Morris was a leader of the Socialist League founded in December 1884.

Fabian Society 
The Fabian Society was founded in 1884, with Beatrice Webb and Sydney Webb being among its leading members. The Fabians influenced members of the Bloomsbury Group and were important in the early history of the Labour Party in the United Kingdom.

Episcopal Church Socialist League and Church League for Industrial Democracy 
Founded by Vida Dutton Scudder in 1911, herself influenced by the Fabian Society, the Episcopal Church Socialist League and its successor, the Church League for Industrial Democracy, sought to ally Christian doctrine with the plight of the working class as a part of the larger social gospel movement that was taking hold of many urban churches across the United States in the early 20th century.

In the November 1914 issue of The Christian Socialist, Spalding stated:

Christian anarchism 

Although anarchists have traditionally been skeptical of or vehemently opposed to organized religion, some anarchists have provided religious interpretations and approaches to anarchism, including the idea that glorification of the state is a form of sinful idolatry. Christian anarchists say anarchism is inherent in Christianity and the Gospels, that it is grounded in the belief that there is only one source of authority to which Christians are ultimately answerable—the authority of God as embodied in the teachings of Jesus. It therefore rejects the idea that human governments have ultimate authority over human societies. Christian anarchists denounce the state, believing it is violent, deceitful, and idolatrous when glorified.

The foundation of Christian anarchism is a rejection of violence, with Leo Tolstoy's The Kingdom of God Is Within You regarded as a key text. Tolstoy sought to separate Russian Orthodox Christianity—which was merged with the state—from what he believed was the true message of Jesus as contained in the Gospels, specifically in the Sermon on the Mount. Tolstoy takes the Christian pacifist viewpoint that all governments who wage war, and churches who in turn support those governments, are an affront to the Christian principles of nonviolence and nonresistance. Although Tolstoy never used Christian anarchism in The Kingdom of God Is Within You, reviews of this book following its publication in 1894 appear to have coined the term.

Christian anarchists hold that the Reign of God is the proper expression of the relationship between God and humanity. Under the Reign of God, human relationships would be characterized by divided authority, servant leadership, and universal compassion—not by the hierarchical, authoritarian structures that are normally attributed to religious social order. Most Christian anarchists are pacifists who reject war and the use of violence. More than any other Bible source, the Sermon on the Mount is used as the basis for Christian anarchism. Tolstoy's The Kingdom of God Is Within You is often regarded as a key text for modern Christian anarchism. 

Critics of Christian anarchism include both Christians and anarchists. Christians often cite Romans 13 as evidence that the state should be obeyed, while secular anarchists do not believe in any authority including God as per the slogan "no gods, no masters". Christian anarchists often believe Romans 13 is taken out of context, emphasizing that Revelation 13 and Isaiah 13, among other passages, are needed to fully understand Romans 13 text.

Christian communism 
Christian communism is a form of religious communism based on Christianity and the view that the teachings of Jesus compel Christians to support communism as the ideal social system. While there is no universal agreement on the exact date when Christian communism was founded, Christian communists say that evidence from the Bible suggests that the first Christians, including the Apostles in the New Testament as described in the Acts, established their own communist society in the years following Jesus' death and resurrection.

Advocates of Christian communism, including other communists, such as Karl Marx, Friedrich Engels, and Karl Kautsky, argue that it was taught by Jesus and practised by the apostles themselves. This is generally agreed by historians. The link was highlighted in one of Marx's early writings, which stated that "[a]s Christ is the intermediary unto whom man unburdens all his divinity, all his religious bonds, so the state is the mediator unto which he transfers all his Godlessness, all his human liberty."

Christian democracy 
The political movement of Christian democracy espouses some values of Christian socialism in the form of economic justice and social welfare. It opposes an individualist worldview and approves state intervention in the economy in defence of human dignity. Because of its close association with Catholicism, Christian democracy differs from Christian socialism by its emphasis on traditional church and family values, its defence of private property, and by its opposition to excessive state intervention.

Salvatore Talamo, a neo-Thomistic sociologist and Catholic social theorist, when distinguishing between the conservative and Christian democratic views on labour issues, used Christian Socialists for the latter; most Christian democrats avoid using socialism, which is occasionally mainly used by conservatives who attempt to discredit their Christian democratic opponents by using a word with Marxist connotations. Christian democratic parties under various names were formed in Europe and Latin America after World War II. Some, such as in Germany and Italy, became a major political force.

Liberation theology 
Liberation theology is a synthesis of Christian theology and socio-economic analyses that emphasizes "social concern for the poor and political liberation for oppressed peoples", as well as "the oppressed and maimed and blind and lame", and bring the "good news to the poor". Beginning in the 1960s after the Second Vatican Council, it became the political praxis of Latin American liberation theologians, such as Gustavo Gutiérrez, Leonardo Boff, and Jesuits like Juan Luis Segundo and Jon Sobrino, who popularized the phrase "preferential option for the poor". This expression was used first by Jesuit Father General Pedro Arrupe in 1968, and the World Synod of Catholic Bishops in 1971 chose as its theme "Justice in the World" for the Second Ordinary General Assembly of the Synod of Bishops.

The Latin American context produced evangelical advocates of liberation theology, such as Rubem Alves, José Míguez Bonino, and C. René Padilla, who called for integral mission in the 1970s, emphasizing evangelism and social responsibility. Theologies of liberation have developed in other parts of the world, such as black theology in the United States and South Africa, Palestinian liberation theology, Dalit theology in India, and Minjung theology in South Korea.

Spiritualism and occultism 
After 1848, utopian socialist ideas continued in new religious movements, such as occultism and spiritualism. They were often marked by a heterodox Christian identity and a decidedly anti-materialist attitude.

In Catholicism 
Communism and socialism have been condemned by Pope Pius IX, Pope Leo XIII, Pope Pius X, Pope Benedict XV, Pope Pius XI, Pope Pius XII, Pope John XXIII, Pope Paul VI, and Pope John Paul II. Pope Benedict XVI condemned both ideologies, while distinguishing them from democratic socialism, which he praised. The views of Pope Francis on the issue have also been called into question, with some arguing he holds socialist or communist views, while others argue he does not. Pope Francis has denied accusations of him being a communist, including by The Economist, calling them a "misinterpretation" of his views. In 2016, Francis criticized Marxist ideology as wrong but praised communists for "[thinking] like Christians".

19th century 
Pope Pius IX criticized socialism in his works Nostis et nobiscum and Quanta cura. In his 1849 work Nostis et nobiscum, he referred to communism and socialism as "wicked theories" that confuse people with what he called "perverted teachings". In his 1864 work Quanta cura, he referred to communism and socialism as a "fatal error". Communism was later further criticized in the 1878 papal encyclical, Quod apostolici muneris, by Pope Leo XIII as he believed that it led to state domination over the freedom of the individual and quelled proper religious worship, inherently turning the top hierarchical power over to the state instead of God. Leo said in this work that socialists steal "the very Gospel itself with a view to deceive more easily the unwary ... [and] distort it so as to suit their own purposes." In the words of academic Catherine Ruth Pakaluk, who refers to the reigns of Pope Pius IX to Pope Pius XXII (1850–1950) as the Leonine era, "socialism and communism appear so often in the papal texts of the Leonine era, and with such importance, that they might be described as central foils over and against which the Church is defined and refined over time."

In his 1891 encyclical Rerum novarum, Pope Leo XIII said that socialism acts against natural injustice and destroys the home. He wrote that materialist socialism "must be utterly rejected" by Catholics. Leo XIII strongly criticized capitalism. According to historian Eamon Duffy, it was revolutionary in that, as recounted by theologian Paul Misner, up until that point, the Vatican was allied with reactionary institutions and monarchies, and it was the first major statement of the old institutions to discuss the realities of 19th-century society and endorse the working class's grievances. In the words of Duffy, "For the successor of Pio Nono to say these things ... was truly revolutionary. Leo's attack on unrestriced capitalism, his insistence on the duty of state intervention on behalf of the worker, his assertion of the right to a living wage and the rights of organised labour, changed the terms of all future Catholic discussions on social questions, and gave weight and authority to more adventurous advocates of Social Catholicism."

Many Catholics and non-Catholics used the Christian socialists label for those who wanted to put Rerum novarum into practice. The Knights of Saint Columbanus can trace its origins back to Rerum novarum. The labour movement in Ireland and the United States traces its origins back to Roman Catholicism and the 1891 encyclical Rerum novarum and the various subsequent encyclicals it spawned. The Starry Plough, a symbol associated with socialism in Ireland, was designed with an explicit reference to Catholicism in mind. The right to association, such as the creation of and involvement in trade unions and co-operatives, are regarded as a core part of Roman Catholic social teaching.

20th century 
In 1901, Leo XIII in his encyclical Graves de communi re referred to socialism as a "harvest of misery". In 1910, Pope Pius X criticized socialism in his Apostolic letter Notre charge apostolique, predicting that the rise of socialism will be "a tumultuous agitation". In 1914, Pope Benedict XV wrote his encyclical, Ad beatissimi Apostolorum, which reaffirmed the anti-socialist stance of the Catholic Church, calling on Catholics to remember "the errors of Socialism and of similar doctrines", as taught by his predecessors.

In 1931, Pope Pius XI wrote his work Quadragesimo anno, wherein Pius described the major dangers for human freedom and dignity arising from unrestrained capitalism and totalitarian communism. Pius XI called upon true socialism to distance itself from totalitarian communism as a matter of clarity and also as a matter of principle. Communists were accused of attempting to overthrow all existing civil society. It was argued that Christian socialism, if allied to communism, was deemed to be an oxymoron because of this. At the time, Pius XI famously wrote: "Religious socialism, Christian socialism, are contradictory terms; no one can be at the same time a good Catholic and a true socialist."

Some prominent Catholic socialists existed during Pope Pius XI's era, including the American anarchist Dorothy Day who advocated for distributism and the Irish priest Michael O'Flanagan who was suspended for his political beliefs. In 1931, it was clarified that a Catholic was free to vote for the Labour Party, the British affiliate of the Socialist International. Later in 1937, Pius XI rejected atheistic communism in an encyclical entitled Divini Redemptoris as "a system full of errors and sophisms", with a "pseudo-ideal of justice, equality, and fraternity" and "a certain false mysticism", and contrasted it with a humane society (civitas humana).

In 1949, Pope Pius XII issued the Decree against Communism, which declared Catholics who professed communist doctrine to be excommunicated as apostates from the Christian faith. In 1952, when referring to socialism, Pius XII stated: "The Church will fight this battle to the end, for it is a question of supreme values: the dignity of man and the salvation of souls." In 1959, on the question of whether Catholics could "associate themselves with the communists and support them with their course of action", a response from the Holy Office under Pope John XXIII replied: "No." On 15 May 1961, John XXIII promulgated the encyclical Mater et magistra, which reaffirmed the Church's anti-socialist stances. John XXIII wrote:

Nonetheless, Pope John XXIII helped the Christian Democracy party to cooperate with the Italian Socialist Party, as part of the Catholic open up to the left.

In 1971, Pope Paul VI wrote the Apostolic Letter, Octogesima adveniens. About Christians and socialism, he wrote: "Too often Christians attracted by socialism tend to idealize it in terms which, apart from anything else, are very general: a will for justice, solidarity and equality. They refuse to recognize the limitations of the historical socialist movements, which remain conditioned by the ideologies from which they originated." Pope John Paul II criticized socialism in his 1991 encyclical Centesimus annus. He wrote:

The 1992 Catechism of the Catholic Church, also promulgated by Pope John Paul II, condemns socialism as an atheistic ideology. Paragraph 2425 states:

21st century 
In 2004, Joseph Ratzinger,  the future Pope Benedict XVI, addressed the Italian Senate, declaring that "[i]n many respects democratic socialism was and is close to Catholic social doctrine; in any case, it contributed toward the formation of a social consciousness." In 2005, Benedict XVI in his encyclical Deus caritas est stated: "We do not need a State which regulates and controls everything, but a State which, in accordance with the principle of subsidiarity, generously acknowledges and supports initiatives arising from the different social forces and combines spontaneity with closeness to those in need. The Church is one of those living forces. ... In the end, the claim that just social structures would make works of charity superfluous masks a materialist conception of man ... a conviction that demeans man and ultimately disregards all that is specifically human." In 2007, Benedict XVI criticized Karl Marx in his encyclical Spe salvi, stating that "[w]ith the victory of the revolution, though, Marx's fundamental error also became evident. He showed precisely how to overthrow the existing order, but he did not say how matters should proceed thereafter. ... He forgot that freedom always remains also freedom for evil. He thought that once the economy had been put right, everything would automatically be put right. His real error is materialism: man, in fact, is not merely the product of economic conditions, and it is not possible to redeem him purely from the outside by creating a favourable economic environment."

Pope Francis has been viewed as having some sympathy to socialist causes, with his frequent criticism of capitalism and of neoliberalism. In 2016, Francis said that the world economy is "[f]undamental terrorism, against all of Humanity", and that "[i]f anything, it is the communists who think like Christians. Christ spoke of a society where the poor, the weak and the marginalized have the right to decide." When later questioned on whether or not he is a communist, Francis responded: "As for whether or not I'm a communist: I am sure that I have not said anything more than what the Church's social doctrine teaches ... maybe the impression of being a little more 'of the left' has been given, but that would be a misinterpretation." In 2013, he said: "The ideology of Marxism is wrong. But I have met many Marxists in my life who are good people, so I don't feel offended."

Movements like liberation theology argue for the compatibility of socialism and Catholicism; they have been rejected by Pope John Paul II and Pope Benedict XVI. António Guterres, a practicing Catholic and Secretary-General of the United Nations since 2017, is the immediate past president of the Socialist International.

In Calvinism

Australia 
In Australia, the academic Roland Boer has attempted to synthesize Calvinism and Marxism. In a 2010 interview, he stated that "it became clear to me that within Christianity there is a strong tradition of political and theological radicalism, which I continued to explore personally. Reformed or Calvinist theology did not seem to sit easily with that interest, so I spent many a long year rejecting that tradition, only to realise later that Calvin himself was torn between the radical potential of elements in the Bible and his own conservative preferences."

France 
In France, the birthplace of Calvinism, the Christianisme Social (Social Christianity) movement emerged in the 1870s from the preaching of Tommy Fallot. Early on, the movement focused on such issues as illiteracy and alcoholism amongst the poor. After the First World War, Social Christianity moved in two directions — towards pacifism and towards ecumenism. Within the movement emerged conscientious objectors, such as Jacques Martin, Philo Vernier, and Henri Roser, economists pursuing policies that reflected cooperation and solidarity, such as Bernard Lavergne and Georges Lasserre, and theologians like Paul Ricoeur. One of the pastors in the movement, Jacques Kaltenbach, was also to have a formative influence on André Trocmé.

Under the Vichy regime, which had seen the emergence of other forms of witness, particularly the support of internees in the camps and aiding Jews to escape, the movement was reborn to tackle the problems of a changing world. It expressed a Christian socialism, more or less in line with the beginning of a new political left. Political activism was very broad and included the denunciation of torture, East–West debate on European integration and taking a stance on the process of decolonization. It facilitated meetings between employers, managers, and trade unionists to discern a new economic order. After the events of May 68, Calvinism in France became much more left-wing in its orientation.

One doctrinal text produced in the 1960s, Church and Authorities, was described as Marxist in its orientation. Churches now seized for themselves the political and social issues to tackle, such as nuclear power and justice for the Third World. In the early 2000s, the Social Christianity movement temporarily discontinued and its journal Other Times ceased to be published. The movement was relaunched on 10 June 2010 with a petition signed by over 240 people, and now maintains an active presence with its own website. Economically, most Calvinists have supported capitalism and have been in the vanguard of promoting free-market capitalism, and have produced many of France's leading entrepreneurs. With regard to politics and social issues, they are socialists. Three of France's post-war prime ministers have been Calvinists, despite Protestants only making up two percent of the population. Two of these prime ministers have been socialists.

Wales 
In Wales, Calvinistic Methodism is the largest non-conformist religion. Its beginnings may be traced to Griffith Jones (1684–1761), of Llanddowror, Carmarthenshire, whose sympathy for the poor led him to set on foot a system of circulating charity schools for the education of children. Until the 19th century, the prevailing thought amongst Welsh non-conformists was that "it would be wiser if the churches limited their activities to those of the altar and not to meddle at all with the state and social questions." This stemmed partly from the traditional nonconformist belief in the separation of church and state.

In his influential sermon Y Ddwy Alwedigaeth (The Two Vocations), Emrys ap Iwan challenged this passive pietism. He wrote: "We must not think, like the old Methodists, Puritans and some Catholics, that we can only seek Godliness outside our earthly vocation." He condemned those Christians who limited godliness to directly religious matters such as Sabbath observance and personal devotion. He declared that all earthly things, including language and culture, have some kind of divine origin. Many of the founders of the Welsh nationalist social-democratic party, Plaid Cymru, were also Calvinists, including John Edward Daniel. Daniel was the theologian credited for bringing neo-orthodoxy to Wales. Daniel argued that God did not create man as an isolated individual but as a social being. The second generation of Plaid Cymru leaders included R. Tudur Jones. His political stance, combined with Calvinist doctrine, created an integrated vision that was significant to the religious life of Christian Wales in the later half of the 20th century. Jones argued that the "state should be a servant, to preserve order and to allow men to live the good life."

In the 21st century, many Calvinist socialists in Wales support same-sex marriage on the grounds that it delivers marriage equality in the eyes of the state, while still allowing churches to follow their own conscience and upholding the traditional Protestant belief in separation of church and state. The Calvinist tradition in Plaid Cymru also influenced its non-violent approach. According to Rhys Llwyd, "[t]he ideal is no fist violence, no verbal violence, and no heart violence. ... Christians ... point to the New Testament example of Jesus Christ clearing the temple. Here there is no suggestion of violence against people; rather the tables are turned as a symbolic act. The life and teaching of Jesus Christ were seen as the foundations of nonviolent direct action [for Plaid Cymru members] ... loving their enemies on the one hand, but not compromising on what they saw as an issue of moral rightness." Plaid Cymru continues to see itself as very much part of the Christian pacifist tradition.

Notable Christian socialist people and groups 

Notable followers of Christian socialism include:
 John Archer, New Zealand politician. He was a former mayor of Christchurch and president of the New Zealand Labour Party.
 Adin Ballou, American proponent of Christian nonresistance. He was a socialist within the Christian anarchist tradition.
 Francis Bellamy, American Baptist minister. He was the original author of the Pledge of Allegiance.
 Tony Benn, British politician. He was a parliamentarian and campaigner for Britain's Labour Party.
 William Dwight Porter Bliss, American Episcopal Church priest. He was also a writer, editor, and socialist activist.
 Sergei Bulgakov, Russian priest, philosopher, and economist. He was a Russian Orthodox Christian theologian.
 Hélder Câmara, Brazilian bishop. A self-identified socialist, he was part of the Roman Catholic Archdiocese of Olinda e Recife.
 Hugo Chávez, former President of Venezuela. He linked socialism and the teachings of Jesus.
 Percy Dearmer, English priest and liturgist. He was a lifelong socialist.
 Tommy Douglas, Canadian politician and Baptist minister. He was the premier of Saskatchewan.
 Marion Howard Dunham, American teacher, activist, and suffragist. She was corresponding secretary of the Women's National Socialist Union.
 Frederick James Furnivall, English philologist. He is one of the co-creators of the New English Dictionary.
 Barry Gardiner, British politician and member of the Labour Party. He identifies as a Christian democratic socialist.
 David Bentley Hart, American Eastern Orthodox Church philosophical theologian. He identifies with the European Christian socialist tradition.
 Thomas Hughes, English lawyer and judge. He was also a politician and author within the Victorian era.
 Hewlett Johnson, English Anglican priest. The author of The Socialist Sixth of the World (1939) and Soviet Russia Since the War (1947), he was known as "The Red Dean of Canterbury".
 Martin Luther King Jr., American Baptist minister. He was also a civil rights activist.
 Charles Kingsley, English university professor, social reformer, historian, novelist, and poet, who was a broad church priest of the Church of England. He is a founder of Christian socialism.
 Kenneth Leech, English Anglican priest and theologian. He is one of the founders of the Jubilee Group, a network of Christian socialists.
 Keir Hardie, Scottish politician and trade unionist. He was one of the founders of Britain's Labour Party and Christian socialist movement.
 John Malcolm Forbes Ludlow, Anglo-Indian barrister. He led the Christian socialist movement and founded its newspaper of the same name.
 F. D. Maurice, English Anglican theologian. He was also a prolific author and one of the founders of Christian socialism.
 Walter Nash, New Zelanad politician. He is a former Prime Minister of New Zealand and leader of the New Zealand Labour Party.
 Myron W. Reed, American lawyer, Congregationalist minister, and political activist. He was a leading voice of the social gospel movement in the American West.
 Kevin Rudd, Austrialian politician. He is a former Prime Minister of Australia and leader of the Australian Labor Party.
 John Ruskin, English writer and philosopher of the Victorian era. His work had a profound effect and was reprinted by the Christian socialist founders of the Working Men's College and William Morris.
 R. H. Tawney, English philosopher. He is identified as an ethical socialist who believed Christianity was the basis of a new morality that secular expression in social democracy.
 Tetsu Katayama, Japanese politician. He is a former Prime Minister of Japan for the Japan Socialist Party.
 Desmond Tutu, South African theologian. He is the former Anglican Archbishop of Cape Town.
 Harry F. Ward, English-born American Methodist minister. He was also a political activist who identified himself with the Christian socialist movement.

Notable Christian socialist groups and parties include:
 Agricultural People's Front of Peru (Peru)
 Christian Democracy (Greece)
 Christians on the Left (United Kingdom)
 Christian Social Party (Netherlands)
 Christian Social Party (Switzerland)
 Citizen Left (Chile)
 Democratic Party factions (Italy)
 Labour Party factions (United Kingdom)
 League of Christian Socialists (Netherlands)
 Sandinista National Liberation Front (Nicaraqua)
 Le Sillon (France)
 Social Democratic Party (Romania)
 Young Republic League (France)

Reception 
In Britain, Christian socialism is viewed positively by many different backgrounds, ranging from Nonconformists to Roman Catholic, particularly Anglo-Catholic Ritualism. It is viewed critically by some socialists, who reject it as utopian socialism and for its methodology, and by some religious figures and popes, who rejected socialism's compatibility with Christianity due its perceived atheism and materialism. Continental Reformed Protestant pastor Henri Nick defended it, saying: "It is not socialism that I would criticise, but atheism falsely called social."

Anglo-Catholic Christian socialism was part of Catholic polemic against perceived Protestant individualism and puritanism, which led many anti-Ritualist Protestants to associate Catholicism and socialism. Charles Haddon Spurgeon, an English Particular Baptist preacher, was critical of socialist doctrines, and warned that those who seek socialism "may soon have too much of it". Specifically, he regarded collectivist Christianity as inferior to faith on an individual level. He said: "I would not have you exchange the gold of individual Christianity for the base metal of Christian Socialism." Tommy Fallot, a French Lutheran pastor, argued: "Socialism has drawn a good deal of its program from the Gospel. It seeks to build a society on the pillars of justice, something the Gospel seeks to do as well. In that regard, a condemnation of socialism would represent a condemnation of the Gospel and the prophets."

Views of Christian socialism generally depends on the left–right political spectrum. While Christian leftists argue that Jesus would prioritize the poor and migrant's rights over opposition to abortion, Christian rightists argue he would be against wealth redistribution, illegal immigrants, abortion, and same-sex marriage. The conservative view is reflected by Lawrence Reed, president emeritus of the American libertarian-leaning Foundation for Economic Education, American conservative and evangelical Christian Johnnie Moore Jr., and Bryan Fischer, an American traditionalist conservative, of the American Family Association, a Christian fundamentalist organization. Opposing this view on the right is Quentin Letts, who said "Jesus preached fairness — you could almost call him a Lefty".

See also 

 Agrarian socialism
 Buddhist socialism
 Catholic Church and politics
 Christian left
 Christian libertarianism
 Christian right
 Christian views on poverty and wealth
 Islamic socialism
 Japan Socialist Party
 Jesus and the rich young man
 Jewish left
 Labour Church
 Labor Zionism
 Omnia sunt communia
 Political theology
 Progressive Christianity
 Religious views on capitalism
 Spiritual left

References

Bibliography

Further reading 

 
 
 
 
 
 
 
 
 
 
 
 
 
 

 
Socialism
Christian terminology
Economy and Christianity
Religious socialism